Veriko (Vera) Ivlianovna Anjaparidze (in Kutaisi – 1987 in Tbilisi) was a Soviet and Georgian stage and film actress.

Life and career
Andjaparidze studied at the Aidarov Drama Studio in Moscow in 1916–1917 and at the Aleksandre Djabadari studio in Tbilisi in 1918–1921. Since 1920, Veriko Anjaparidze was an actress at the Shota Rustaveli State Theater in Tbilisi, and since 1927 she moved to the Marjanishvili Theatre, also in Tbilisi. Later, she became the art director of the theater. She was also teaching at the Shota Rustaveli Tbilisi Theater Institute.

Andjaparidze’s film debut was in Vladimir Barskii’s Horrors of the Past (1925). She then played supporting parts in Yuri Zheliabuzhskii’s Dina Dza-Dzu (1926) and Nikoloz Shengelaia’s Twenty-six Commissars (1932). In 1929, Andjaparidze starred in Mikheil Chiaureli’s morality tale about alcoholism Saba. She soon achieved a unique status as one of the leading female actresses of Georgian cinema, who was honored under all Soviet political leaders, from Iosif Stalin to Mikhail Gorbachev. She also starred as Rusudan in Chiaureli’s epic Georgi Zaakadze (1942–1946), the kolkhoz director Nino in Nikoloz Sanishvili’s comedy Happy Encounter (1949), and the lead in Siko Dolidze’s popular rural drama Encounter with the Past (1966). Tengiz Abuladze cast Andjaparidze in a minor yet essential role in his anti-totalitarian testament Repentance (1984).

Veriko Anjaparidze was awarded the Stalin Prize in 1943, 1946, and 1952. In 1950, she was awarded the title of the People's Artist of the USSR and a Hero of Socialist Labour in 1979.

Personal life
She was the wife of the film director Mikheil Chiaureli and the mother of the actress Sofiko Chiaureli. Anjaparidze is buried in Mtatsminda Pantheon.

Selected filmography
Saba (1929) as Maro
Giorgi Saakadze (1942) as Rusudan
Keto and Kote (1948) as princess
The Fall of Berlin (1950) as mother of killed German soldier Hans
 Don't Grieve (1969) as Kalantadze's mother  
 The Legend of Suram Fortress (1985) as old fortune teller
Repentance (1987) as wanderer

References

External links 

 
Veriko Anjaparidze on Georgian National Filmography

1897 births
1987 deaths
20th-century actresses from Georgia (country)
People from Kutaisi
Communist Party of the Soviet Union members
Heroes of Socialist Labour
People's Artists of the USSR
Stalin Prize winners
Recipients of the Order of Lenin
Recipients of the Order of the Red Banner of Labour
Rustaveli Prize winners
Film actresses from Georgia (country)
Stage actresses from Georgia (country)
Soviet film actresses
Soviet stage actresses
Burials at Mtatsminda Pantheon
Burials in Georgia (country)